The Nova Express Café was a science-fiction-themed cafe and restaurant in Los Angeles, named as an homage to the William S. Burroughs satirical sci-fi novel, Nova Express. It was located across the street from Canter's Deli, and adjacent to the original location of Largo.  The business was in operation for 15 years, from June 1993 until March 2008.

History

The establishment was the creation of sculptor and conceptual artist Cary Lewis Long and Argentinian actress Victoria Judith Adji Keter.  Long studied art and philosophy at Berkeley, and saw the project as an integration of art and society.   Besides serving food and drink, Nova Express Cafe was a venue for experimental music and performance, poetry readings,  rock bands, storytelling and art events.

Working with a limited budget, the Cafe was made almost entirely from found and second-hand materials.  A fan of fantasy architecture, Long painted many surfaces to fluoresce under black light, including ameoba-shaped tables and a silhouette-filled screen constructed with stencils made with an X-Acto knife, auto paint and a pizza box. The rocket-like chairs were found at the Pick Your Parts junkyard and refurbished."

In a farewell missive, Long said: “I believe the humanizing benefits of art are profoundly important, and I also think that there should just be more art in the world. My hope was to present art under conditions that were open and direct; as part of what it would mean to live in a more open society. Nova Express Cafe was meant to illustrate how art might function in a more democratic, evenly distributed, and less exclusive way.”

References

External links 
 http://www.architizer.com/projects/nova-express-cafe/
 http://new.hollywoodgothique.com/a-tragedy-of-galactic-proportions-nova-express-cafe-is-closing/
 https://www.youtube.com/watch?v=GUUx8x309iQ Norton Wisdom and Magic Box performs at Nova Express Cafe
 https://www.youtube.com/watch?v=0eaqk1SxnyE Zen Boy & Karma Girl pay tribute
 http://coilhouse.net/2008/03/goodbye-nova-express Goodbye Nova Express
 http://www.yelp.com/biz/nova-express-cafe-los-angeles
 https://web.archive.org/web/20171105225417/http://laist.com/2008/03/02/nova_express_closing.php
 http://joelmark.com/nova-express-cafe/
 https://www.facebook.com/NovaExpressCafe/
 https://bearsuits.wordpress.com/category/nova-express-cafe/
 https://www.flickr.com/photos/mrcrash/175257074/in/photostream/
 https://web.archive.org/web/20151208161149/http://junglescene.com/event-21610-NOVA_EXPRESS_CAFE_FAREWELL_PARTY_Saturday__March_1st__9pm_4am.html
 http://woospace.blogspot.com/2006/05/nova-express.html
 http://blog.dappercadaver.com/2008/06/20/dark-spots-in-tinsel-town-part-2/

Defunct restaurants in Los Angeles
Theme restaurants
Restaurants established in 1993
1993 establishments in California